Huiji District, formerly Mangshan District, is one of 6 urban districts of the prefecture-level city of Zhengzhou, the capital of Henan Province, South Central China.

Located south of the Yellow River and north of Zhongyuan and Jinshui, much of Huiji lies outside Zhengzhou's urban area and is overall still an agricultural area, though many upper-class villas and townhouse complex are located here due to its relatively pristine environment.

There are many tourist attractions located just south of the Yellow River, including Mount Mang, Huayuankou, Fujing Ecological Garden, Dahe village, and the Yellow River Wetland Protected Area, as well as the proposed Zhengzhou Wildlife Park.

Administrative divisions
Huiji has six subdistricts and two towns:

Subdistricts:
Xincheng
Liuzhai
Laoyachen
Changxinglu
Yingbinlu
Dahelu
Towns:
Guxing
Huayuankou

References

External links
Official website of Huiji District Government

Districts of Zhengzhou